Meeting de Paris (formerly known as the Meeting Areva and Meeting Gaz de France) is an annual track and field meeting at the Stade Sébastien Charléty in Paris, France. Previously one of the IAAF Golden League events, it is now part of the Diamond League. It was first organized in 1999. The record attendance was set on 1 July 2005, with a total of 70,253 spectators.

History

The origins of the meet date back to 1984 when Michel Zilbermann organised an athletics meeting at the Stade Auguste Delaune. Another meeting in Paris was held annually in the Stade Sébastien Charléty. The two meets collaborated to create a new event in the Stade de France in 1999. Following this, the two meetings officially merged to become one meet in 2000. The meeting's founder Zilbermann died in April 2008 following a long illness.

The 2009 event was marred by heavy rain but Kenenisa Bekele, Kerron Stewart, Sanya Richards and Yelena Isinbayeva all remained on target for the 2009 Golden League jackpot. A particular highlight was Usain Bolt's 9.79 seconds run for the 100 m meet record, which was closely followed by a national-record-breaking Daniel Bailey. There were 46,500 people in attendance to see new French record holder Renaud Lavillenie win the pole vault competition.

The 2013 event was headlined by Usain Bolt setting a World Leading time in the 200m in front of 50,226 fans.

In 2017, the meeting moved back to Stade Sébastien Charléty.

The 2020 edition was cancelled due to the COVID-19 pandemic.

Editions

Meeting records

Men

Women

References

External links

 Diamond League – Paris Official Web Site

 
Diamond League
IAAF Golden League
Recurring sporting events established in 2000
Athletics competitions in France
M
Annual track and field meetings
IAAF Grand Prix
IAAF World Outdoor Meetings
Athletics in Paris